Ratti may refer to:
 Ratti, traditional Indian unit of mass measurement
 Ratti Gali Lake, an alpine glacial lake located in Neelum Valley, Azad Kashmir, Pakistan
 Ratti (surname), Italian surname
 Ratti family, Italian family
 Vince Ratti, American pop rock band that originated in Philadelphia